Lloydsville may refer to:

Lloydsville, Ohio, an unincorporated community
Lloydsville, Pennsylvania, an unincorporated community